Buriadiaceae is a family of conifers that existed in the Carboniferous to Permian.

References

Prehistoric plant families
Voltziales